Luscosmodicum is a genus of beetle in the family Cerambycidae, it contains a single species Luscosmodicum beaveri. It was described by Martins in 1970.

References

Obriini
Beetles described in 1970